Welsh Mountain may refer to:
Welsh Mountain sheep, a type of sheep originating in the Welsh mountains
Welsh Mountain pony, the smallest of four types of Welsh Pony, often kept free-ranging on mountains